PP-124 Jhang-I is a constituency of the Provincial Assembly of Punjab.

General elections 2013

General elections 2008

See also
 PP-123 Toba Tek Singh-VI
 PP-125 Jhang-II

References

External links
 Election commission Pakistan's official website
 Awazoday.com check result
 Official Website of Government of Punjab

Provincial constituencies of Punjab, Pakistan